The eighth season of Chicago Med, an American medical drama television series with executive producer Dick Wolf, and producers Michael Brandt, Derek Haas, Peter Jankowski, Andrew Schneider and Diane Frolov, was ordered on February 27, 2020. The season premiered on September 21, 2022.

Cast

Main characters
 Nick Gehlfuss as Dr. Will Halstead, Supervising Attending Emergency Physician
 Brian Tee as LCDR Dr. Ethan Choi, Attending Emergency Physician/Chief of the ED. (episodes 1-9)
 Marlyne Barrett as Maggie Campbell, RN, ED Charge Nurse
 S. Epatha Merkerson as Sharon Goodwin, Chief of Patient and Medical Services
 Oliver Platt as Dr. Daniel Charles, Chief of Psychiatry
 Dominic Rains as Dr. Crockett Marcel, Trauma Surgeon
 Guy Lockard as  Dr. Dylan Scott, Emergency Medicine/Pediatrics Resident (episode 1)
 Steven Weber as Dr. Dean Archer, Trauma Surgeon
 Jessy Schram as Dr. Hannah Asher, Attending Emergency Physician

Recurring characters
Lilah Richcreek Estrada as Dr. Nellie Cuevas
Devin Kawaoka as Dr. Kai Tanaka-Reed 
Conor Perkins as Dr. Zach Hudgins 
Sasha Roiz as Jack Dayton 
Marc Grapey as Peter Kalmick 
Asjha Cooper as Dr. Vanessa Taylor, Emergency Medicine Resident
Wayne T. Carr as Grant Young
Ivan Shaw as Dr. Justin Lieu
Charles Malik Whitfield as Ben Campbell
Brennan Brown as Dr. Samuel Abrams, Attending Neurosurgeon
Yaya DaCosta as Nurse April Sexton, Nurse Practitioner
Luigi Sottile as Sean Archer 
Mishael Morgan as Doctor Petra Dupre 
Alet Taylor as Liliana Wapniarski

Crossover characters
 Taylor Kinney as Lieutenant Kelly Severide
 Kara Killmer as Paramedic Sylvie Brett
 David Eigenberg as Lieutenant Christopher Herrmann
 Alberto Rosende as Firefighter Blake Gallo
 Tracy Spiridakos as Detective Hailey Upton
 Marina Squerciati as Officer Kim Burgess
 LaRoyce Hawkins as Officer Kevin Atwater

Episodes

Ratings

References

External links

2022 American television seasons
2023 American television seasons
Chicago Med seasons